FC Angara Boguchany was a Russian football team from Boguchany, Krasnoyarsk Krai. It played professionally for a single season in 1992 in the Russian Second Division.

External links
 Team history at KLISF

Association football clubs established in 1992
Association football clubs disestablished in 1993
Defunct football clubs in Russia
Sport in Krasnoyarsk Krai
1992 establishments in Russia
1993 disestablishments in Russia